Vincent Lewis Rorison (1851–1910) was an Anglican priest in the late 19th and early 20th centuries.

Life

He was born in 1851 and educated at Trinity College, Glenalmond.

He then studied divinity at the University of Aberdeen. Ordained in 1874, he was Chaplain to the Bishop of Aberdeen after which he was Rector of St John's Forfar before being appointed Provost of St Ninian's Cathedral, Perth in 1885, a post he held for 16 years. His final appointment was as Dean of St Andrews, Dunkeld and Dunblane.

He died on 27 August 1910.

Family

He was buried with his wife, Edith Alice Susan Stephenson (died 1924) in Wellshill Cemetery in northern Perth. Their daughter Edith Anna Sinclair Rorison lies with them. The very distinctive grave, with an open St Andrews Cross, stands near the summit of the cemetery. Another daughter Emma Rose Grey Rorison died aged only 13 years old in 1902.

He was the father of Canon Harry Rorison.

References

1851 births
People educated at Glenalmond College
Alumni of the University of Aberdeen
Provosts of St Ninian's Cathedral, Perth
Deans of St Andrews, Dunkeld and Dunblane
1910 deaths